James Boyle (born 1959) is a Scottish intellectual property scholar. He is the William Neal Reynolds Professor of Law and co-founder of the Center for the Study of the Public Domain at Duke University School of Law in Durham, North Carolina. He is most prominently known for his advocating for loosening copyright policies in the United States and worldwide.

Teaching and activism
Boyle graduated from the University of Glasgow in 1980 and subsequently studied at Harvard Law School. He joined Duke University School of Law in July 2000. He had previously taught at American University, Yale, Harvard, and the University of Pennsylvania Law School.

In 2002, he was one of the founding board members of Creative Commons, and held the position of Chairman of the Board in 2009, after which he stepped down. He also co-founded Science Commons, which aims to expand the Creative Commons mission into the realm of scientific and technical data, and ccLearn, a division of Creative Commons aimed at facilitating access to open education resources.

In 2006, he earned the Duke Bar Association Distinguished Teaching Award.

The courses he teaches include "Intellectual Property", "The Constitution in Cyberspace", "Law and Literature", "Jurisprudence", and "Torts".

Written works
He is the author of Shamans, Software and Spleens: Law and Construction of the Information Society as well as a novel published under a Creative Commons license, The Shakespeare Chronicles.

In his work on intellectual property, The Public Domain: Enclosing the Commons of the Mind (2008), Boyle argues that the current system of copyright protections fails to fulfill the original intent of copyright: rewarding and encouraging creativity. It was also published under a non-commercial CC BY-NC-SA Creative Commons license.

Boyle also contributes a column to the Financial Times New Technology Policy Forum.

In 2011, Boyle was one of five experts consulted for the Hargreaves Review of Intellectual Property and Growth, a comprehensive analysis of the United Kingdom's intellectual property system that made suggestions for data-driven reform of the system.

Selected publications 
 Shamans, Software and Spleens: Law and Construction of the Information Society, Harvard University Press 1997, 
 The Public Domain (ed), Winter/Spring 2003 edition of Law and Contemporary Problems (vol 66, ##1–2), Duke University School of Law
 Bound by Law? Tales from the Public Domain , Duke University Center for the Study of the Public Domain 2006, 
 Cultural Environmentalism @ 10 (ed, with Lawrence Lessig), Spring 2007 edition of Law and Contemporary Problems (vol 70, #2), Duke University School of Law
 Cultural Environmentalism and Beyond
 The Shakespeare Chronicles: A Novel, Lulu Press 2006, 
 Public Domain: Enclosing the Commons of the Mind, Yale University Press 2008, 
 Theft: A History of Music, CreateSpace Independent Publishing Platform 2017,

References

External links 

 
 Biography at Duke University School of Law
 
 The Public Domain: Enclosing the Commons of the Mind, 2008
 RSA Vision webcast – James Boyle on "The Public Domain: enclosing the commons of the mind"
 
 
 

1959 births
20th-century Scottish educators
21st-century Scottish educators
Access to Knowledge activists
Alumni of the University of Glasgow
American legal scholars
Computer law scholars
Copyright scholars
Copyright activists
Creative Commons
Creative Commons-licensed authors
Duke University School of Law faculty
Harvard Law School alumni
Harvard Law School faculty
Living people
British male essayists
Male novelists
Scottish male writers
Place of birth missing (living people)
Scottish columnists
Scottish emigrants to the United States
Scottish legal professionals
Scottish legal scholars
University of Pennsylvania Law School alumni